Roman Ostashchenko (born 26 September 1992) is a Russian handball player for Chekhovskiye Medvedi and the Russian national team.

He represented Russia at the 2019 World Men's Handball Championship.

References

1992 births
Living people
Russian male handball players